John Carter may refer to:

Business
 John Carter (businessman) (born 1961/62), British businessman, CEO of Travis Perkins
 John Carter (insurance executive) (born 1937), chairman of Commercial Union (1994–1998)
 John W. Carter (died 1895), partner in Carter's Ink Company in Massachusetts

Arts and entertainment
 John Carter (author) (1905–1975), English author, book-collector and bookseller
 John Carter (actor) (1927–2015), American actor and director
 Carter (artist), (born 1970), John Carter, American artist and film director
 John Carter (sound engineer) (1907–1982), American film audio engineer
 John Carter (film editor) (1922–2018), American film editor
 John Carter (mouth artist) (1815–1850), disabled English artist
 John Charles Carter, birth name of actor Charlton Heston

Media
 John Carter (film), a 2012 film about the Burroughs character on Mars
 Princess of Mars, a 2009 direct-to-DVD film retitled in 2012 to John Carter of Mars
 John Carter, Warlord of Mars, a Marvel Comics series created in 1977
 John Carter, Warlord of Mars (role-playing game), 1978
 John Carter: Warlord of Mars, board game

Music
 John Carter (jazz musician) (1928–1991), American jazz musician
 John Carter (English musician) (born 1942), English singer-songwriter
 John S. Carter (1945–2011), American music executive, producer, and songwriter, often known simply as Carter
 Johnny Carter (singer) (1934–2009), American singer and member of the Dells and the Flamingos

Fictional characters
 John Carter of Mars, a character from the classic science fiction series of novels by Edgar Rice Burroughs
 John Carter (ER), a character from the television series ER played by Noah Wyle
 John Carter (Little House)
 Johnny Carter (EastEnders), a character from the television series EastEnders

Military
 John Carter (Royal Navy officer) (1785–1863), Irish born Royal Navy officer during the French Revolutionary and Napoleonic Wars

 John C. Carter (1805–1870), U.S. Naval officer including during the American Civil War
 John C. Carter (1837–1864), Confederate general in the American Civil War
 John J. Carter (1842–1917), Irish officer who fought in the American Civil War

Politics

United States
 Jack Carter (politician) (John William Carter, born 1947), U.S. Senate candidate from Nevada, son of President Jimmy Carter
 John Carter (South Carolina politician) (1792–1850), U.S. Representative from South Carolina
 John Carter (Texas politician) (born 1941), U.S. Representative from Texas
 John A. Carter (Virginia politician) (1808–1895), delegate to Virginia Constitutional Convention of 1850
 John R. Carter (diplomat) (1864–1944), U.S. diplomat and banker
 John Prentiss Carter (1840–1925), lieutenant governor of Mississippi
 John Carter, Sr. (1613–1670), English merchant and politician in Virginia, founder of the Carter Family of Virginia
 John Carter, Jr. (burgess) (died 1690), son of John Carter, Sr. and member of the Virginia House of Burgesses
 John Carter, U.S. Air Force veteran and candidate for the U.S. House of Representatives in North Carolina in 2010

United Kingdom
 John Carter (died 1408), MP for Scarborough
 John Carter (died 1432), MP for Scarborough
 John Carter (Roundhead) (died 1676), English Parliamentary soldier and politician
 John Carter (Mayor of Portsmouth) (1741–1808), English merchant and mayor

Other countries
 John Chilton Lambton Carter (1816–1872), New Zealand politician 
 John Carter (Australian politician) (1893–1971), Australian politician
 John Carter (New Zealand politician) (born 1950), New Zealand politician and mayor of the Far North District
 John A. Carter (Newfoundland politician) (1933–2017), politician and farmer in Newfoundland, Canada
 John Carter (ambassador) (1919–2005), Guyanese politician, lawyer and diplomat

Religion
 John S. Carter (Latter Day Saints) (1792–1834), early American leader in the Latter Day Saint movement
 John Carter (Christadelphian) (1899–1962), editor of The Christadelphian from 1937 to 1962
 John Carter (evangelist), Seventh-day Adventist evangelist
 John Carter (priest), English Anglican priest

Sports
 John Carter (cricketer, born 1935), former English cricketer
 John Carter (cricketer, born 1963), former English cricketer
 John Carter (ice hockey) (born 1963), professional ice hockey player
 Johnny Carter (footballer) (1894–1960), Australian footballer

Other
 John Carter (architect) (1748–1817), English draughtsman and architect
 John Coates Carter (1859–1927), English architect
 John Carter (smuggler) (1770–1807), "King of Prussia", smuggler operating out of Prussia Cove, Cornwall
 Lynching of John Carter (died 1927), African-American man murdered by a white mob
 John Carter (police officer) (1882–1944), Assistant Commissioner of the London Metropolitan Police, 1938–1940
 John Franklin Carter (1897–1967), American journalist
 John Cain Carter (born 1966), American rancher and environmentalist
 John Carter (endocrinologist) (born 1944), Australian medical academic and endocrinologist
 John Carter (printer), American printer and newspaper publisher
 John Mack Carter, American publishing industry figure
 John Corrie Carter, English barrister, High Sheriff, author and sportsman
 John Carter (1942–2000), founder of Carters Steam Fair

See also
 Jack Carter (disambiguation)
 Jonathan Carter (disambiguation)
 Jon Carter (born 1970), English musician
 Jon Carter (American football) (born 1965)